Martin Schröttle (1 September 1901 – 17 February 1972) was a German ice hockey player who competed in the 1928 Winter Olympics and 1932 Winter Olympics.

In 1928 he was a member of the German ice hockey team, which placed last in his preliminary group of the Olympic tournament and did not advance. Four years later his team won the bronze medal.

Schröttle was a European champion in 1930 and German champion in 1927, 1935 and 1938. He scored 8 goals in his 37 international matches. He was later inducted into the German Ice Hockey Hall of Fame. In 1955 he co-wrote the book Eishockey in Wort und Bild.

References

1901 births
1972 deaths
Ice hockey players at the 1928 Winter Olympics
Ice hockey players at the 1932 Winter Olympics
Medalists at the 1932 Winter Olympics
Olympic bronze medalists for Germany
Olympic ice hockey players of Germany
Olympic medalists in ice hockey
SC Riessersee players
Sportspeople from Munich